Jewel Forde is a television producer and presenter with the Caribbean Broadcasting Corporation in Barbados. She has hosted "Monitor" and worked as an announcer on CBC 900 AM radio. She is also joint public relations officer for the Barbados Association of Journalists.

Forde has a Diploma in Mass Communications from University of the West Indies, Mona in Jamaica and a master's degree in Journalism Studies from the University of Cardiff.

References

Barbadian television presenters
Women television presenters
Barbadian radio presenters
Barbadian women radio presenters
Year of birth missing (living people)
Living people
Caribbean Broadcasting Corporation